Jan Bobrovský (born March 29, 1945, Rosice) is a former Czechoslovak professional basketball player, coach, and sports official. He is listed on the honor meritorious deed Sports Masters. His son in law is a former football defender Petr Křivánek.

Basketball playing career
Bobrovský mainly played with Spartak ZJŠ Brno / Zbrojovka Brno and Czechoslovakia, with whom he participated in the 1972 Olympics and six European Championships, where he won the silver and one bronze medal. At the 1970 World Championship was the second best scorer of the national team of Czechoslovakia. For Czechoslovakia he played a total of 267 matches, including matches in the Olympic Games (including training), World Championships and European Championships, and scored a total of 748 points in 78 matches. In 1965 he was nominated for two teams match up choosing to FIBA Europe Festivals.

As a player of Zbrojovka Brno between 1958 and 1972, he was seven times champion and five times runner-up of Czechoslovakia.  In the Czechoslovak Basketball League after 1962 (introduction of detailed statistics matches) he scored 9,915 points. With Zbrojovka Brno has been successful in the European Champions Cup, when he lost twice in the finals against Real Madrid (1963–64, 1967–68) and twice played in the semi-finals (1962–63, 1968–69). In the World Cup Intercontinental clubs in January 1969 in Zbrojovka Brno semifinal win over Real Madrid and 84–77 in the finals defeated American Akron Goodyear Wingfoots 71:84. [Ed. 1]

Basketball coaching career
After finishing his playing career, Bobrovský successfully he worked as a coach in Zbrojovka Brno (men) and IMOS Brno - Žabovřesky (women) and representative teams of Czechoslovakia respectively. He did the same for the Czech Republic national teams (men & women). As a coach between 1974 and 1980 he was three times champion and twice runner-up of Czechoslovakia.

In 2001, in a poll about the best Czech basketball players of the twentieth century, he ended up tied for 5th place. In 2013 he was inducted into the Czech Basketball Federation Hall of Fame.

Political career
In the municipal elections of 1994 Bobrovský was elected as an independent for ODA to the borough council Brno-Žabovřesky. The mandate of representative district upheld in municipal elections in 1998, even as a non-ODA  in 2002, 2006 2006  pak už jako nestraník za ODS.

Ve volbách do Senátu PČR v roce 2014 kandidoval jako nestraník za ODS v obvodu č. 60 – Brno-město. and 2010 [9], then as an independent for the ODS.

In elections to the Senate in 2014 as an independent candidate for the ODS in the district no. 60 - Brno city. With a score of 15.77% of the vote, he finished in 3rd place and did not advance to the second round.

See also 
 List of EuroBasket Women winning head coaches
Czechoslovak Basketball League career stats leaders

References

External links
FIBA Profile

1945 births
Living people
Basketball players at the 1972 Summer Olympics
Czech basketball coaches
Czech men's basketball players
Czechoslovak basketball coaches
Czechoslovak men's basketball players
1970 FIBA World Championship players
Olympic basketball players of Czechoslovakia
People from Rosice
Shooting guards
Small forwards
Sportspeople from the South Moravian Region